California is a station on the Chicago Transit Authority's 'L' system, serving the Pink Line and the Little Village neighborhood. The station opened on March 10, 1902, as part of the Metropolitan West Side Elevated Railroad's Douglas Park branch. It is the closest station to Cook County Jail.

Structure
The station consists of a single elevated island platform with two entrances: a primary accessible full-service entrance with ticket vending machines on the east side of California Avenue, and a secondary farecard-only non-accessible entrance on the west side of California Avenue. Immediately to the west of the station, the tracks ramp up to cross over the BNSF Railway and associated Metra line.

Bus connections
CTA
  94 California

Notes and references

Notes

References

External links
California Avenue entrance from Google Maps Street View

CTA Pink Line stations
Railway stations in the United States opened in 1902
South Lawndale, Chicago